Zeugopterus is a genus of turbots native to the north Atlantic Ocean.

Species
There are currently two recognized species in this genus:
 Zeugopterus punctatus (Bloch, 1787) (Topknot)
 Zeugopterus regius (Bonnaterre, 1788) (Eckström's topknot)

References

Scophthalmidae
Marine fish genera
 
Taxa named by Carl Moritz Gottsche